Alain Richard Ebwelle (born 28 September 1995) is a Cameroonian professional footballer who plays as a left winger for Greek Super League 2 club Episkopi.

Career
Born in Ebolowa, Ebwelle joined Barcelona's youth setup in 2011, from Samuel Eto'o Academy. On 4 June 2014, he agreed to a move to Valencia, being initially assigned to the reserves in Segunda División B.

Ebwelle appeared rarely during the campaign, and was subsequently released. On 1 February 2016, after six months without a club, he signed for Castellón in Tercera División.

In 2016, Ebwelle moved to Fortuna Liga side Senica, along with a host of Spanish-based players. He made his professional debut on 30 July, against Zemplín Michalovce.

On 3 January 2017, Ebwelle agreed to a contract with Marbella, back to Spain and its third division. On 25 August, he moved to fellow league team Córdoba CF B.

On 17 August 2020, he joined Polish club Radomiak Radom.

Honours

Club
Barcelona
 UEFA Youth League: 2013–14

References

External links
 
  
 Futbalnet Profile

1995 births
Living people
People from Ebolowa
Cameroonian footballers
Association football wingers
Segunda División B players
Tercera División players
Slovak Super Liga players
Veikkausliiga players
I liga players
Valencia CF Mestalla footballers
CD Castellón footballers
Córdoba CF B players
FK Senica players
Écija Balompié players
Vaasan Palloseura players
IFK Mariehamn players
Radomiak Radom players
Cameroonian expatriate footballers
Cameroonian expatriate sportspeople in Spain
Cameroonian expatriate sportspeople in Slovakia
Cameroonian expatriate sportspeople in Finland
Expatriate footballers in Spain
Expatriate footballers in Slovakia
Expatriate footballers in Finland
Expatriate footballers in Poland